Hara University is a private university located in the city of Khost, southeastern Afghanistan.

See also 
List of universities in Afghanistan

References

External links 
Kankor entrance exams

Universities in Afghanistan
Educational institutions established in 2007
2007 establishments in Afghanistan
Khost